Odax pullus, the greenbone or butterfish, is a species of ray-finned fish, a weed whiting from the family Odacidae, which is found around New Zealand.  It inhabits shallow, rocky areas with brown algae growth, mainly Carpophyllum, upon which it grazes.  This species can reach a length of  SL and has been recorded as reaching .  It is of minor importance to local commercial fisheries. Its range includes the Chatham Islands, Antipodes Islands and Bounty Islands but it is not present around the Three Kings Islands, where it is replaced by the endemic bluefinned butterfish O. cyanoallix.

References

Odax
Fish described in 1801
Taxa named by Johann Reinhold Forster